Via Padova 46 is a 1953 Italian comedy film directed by Giorgio Bianchi and starring Peppino De Filippo, Alberto Sordi, Giulietta Masina and Arlette Poirier.

The film's sets were designed by the art director Saverio D'Eugenio. It earned around 142 million lira at the box office.

Synopsis
In postwar Rome a clerk at the finance ministry leads a dull, monotonous life at work and had home where he lives with his hypochondriac wife and domineering mother-in-law. His life takes on air of excitement, however, when he is invited to a rendezvous at an apartment on the Via Padova with an attractive foreign woman. On arriving there he finds her murdered and now fears that the police are close on his trail.

Songs 
In the scene where Arduino Buongiorno goes alone on Sunday afternoon to the Italia bar in Piazza della Repubblica in Rome to get some vanilla cake, the song Maria Magdalena sung by Flo Sandon's with the orchestra conducted by Federico is heard to the rhythm of samba Bergamini.

Cast
 Peppino De Filippo as Arduino Buongiorno
 Alberto Sordi as Gianrico
 Giulietta Masina as Irene
 Arlette Poirier as Marcella Dupont
 Leopoldo Trieste as The Man with a Cigarette
 Ada Dondini as Arduino's Mother-in-Law
 Lidia Martora as Carmela
 Luigi Pavese as The Office Manager
 Ernesto Almirante as Cesare
 Memmo Carotenuto as Bertuccelli
 Lamberto Maggiorani as The Porter in Via Padova
 Carlo Dapporto as Avvocato Tancredo Tancredi
 Vittorio Duse as Policeman at the Airport
 Franco Giacobini as The Journalist

References

Bibliography 
 Chiti, Roberto & Poppi, Roberto. Dizionario del cinema italiano: Dal 1945 al 1959. Gremese Editore, 1991.

External links 
 

1953 films
Italian comedy films
1953 comedy films
1950s Italian-language films
Films directed by Giorgio Bianchi
Italian black-and-white films
Films shot in Rome
Films set in Rome
1950s Italian films

it:Lo scocciatore (Via Padova 46)